Collegians are an Australian rugby league football team based in Wollongong. The club are a part of Country Rugby League and compete in the Illawarra Rugby League premiership.

Originally known as CBC Old Boys, the Club was founded in 1933. The Brothers Club was then admitted to the Illawarra 1st Grade competition in 1938.

As of 2013 Collegians will call the new Lysaghts Oval, Figtree home. Collegians wear red and black jerseys and have won 9 minor premierships and 12 premierships. The Collegians Leagues club is a thriving club in North Wollongong.

Honours

Team
 Illawarra Rugby League First Grade Premierships: 12
1967, 1987, 1996, 1997, 1998, 2004, 2005, 2007, 2013, 2017, 2019, 2022
 Illawarra Rugby League Minor Premierships: 9
1986, 1996, 1998, 1999, 2001, 2002, 2004, 2005, 2013

Individual
Recent 10 Year Servicemen (# of games) = James Andraos (186), James Sara (127), Josh Porter (102)

Players
Notable former players of the Collegians club include:
Ron Costello
Michael Bolt

References

External links
 Dapto Canaries Homepage
 Country Rugby League Homepage
 Country Rugby League
 Illawarra Rugby League Homepage
 Illawarra Rugby League

Rugby league teams in New South Wales
Rugby league teams in Wollongong
Rugby clubs established in 1933
1933 establishments in Australia